Picralinal is a bio-active alkaloid from Alstonia scholaris, a medicinal tree of West Africa.

Notes

Tryptamine alkaloids
Quinolizidine alkaloids
Methyl esters
Oxygen heterocycles
Heterocyclic compounds with 6 rings